EDePro (Engine Development and Production) is a company based in Belgrade, Serbia which develops solutions for solid rockets, turbojet powered missiles and production of energetic materials.

History 
EDePro was founded in 1985 at the Faculty of Mechanical Engineering at the University of Belgrade.

On November 23, 2021, an explosion in the storage area of an EDePro engine plant killed two people and wounded 16 more.

Management and ownership 
Currently EDePro is led and owned by four people: Branislav Jojić, Milivoje Popović, Momčilo Šljukić, and Slobodan Petković.

Products

Artillery Base Bleed Units 
 R-107 mm - The “107” multiple rocket system is an anti-personnel weapon developed for light artillery, infantry and special forces units. EDePro rocket “107-ER” is fully compatible with the multiple rocket launcher systems used for the original rocket.
 R122 mm G-2000/G-M - Rocket “G-2000” is a 122mm caliber with an approximate range over 40 km which is currently the longest-range rocket.
 R267 mm - Rocket motor “RM-267” is primarily designed as a technological demonstrator for the production of large diameter artillery rockets, with better performance.

Anti-Hail Rockets 
 AHR_A6 & AHR_A8 - Rockets used to destruct hail storms and are re-usable.

R60 Air to Air Rocket Motor 
 RM-R60 - Rocket motor EDePro RM-R60 and gas generator EDePro GG-R60 are developed and produced for overhaul purposes of widely spread Russian self-guided air to air missile systems R60M(MK).

Turbojet Engines 
 TMM-040 “Mongoose” - TMM-040 is a small, single shaft, turbojet engine rated for 40 daN of static thrust.
 Auxiliary Power Unit TM40 - APU is based on turbo-shaft, single stage radial compressor, turbine, annular combustion chamber, engine TM40 with max. power of 40 kW.

Liquid Propellant Rocket Motor TRM-3500 
 TRM-3500 - The motor has been developed based on an existing Russian motor used on rockets SAM-2 and SAM-3 (Dvina and Volkov)

Developments 

 ALAS - Advanced Light Attack System (ALAS) is a fire & forget, observe and update, multipurpose, TV guided weapon system.
 R400 mm - A 392 mm artillery rocket for tactical battlefield support.
 Rocket Assisted/Base Bleed Projectile - The (HE RA/BB 155mm) projectile is a rocket-assisted base bleed projectile that will extend the operational range of most 39, 45 and 52 caliber 155mm gun howitzers by over 10 km.
SkyPickup – Light Transport Aircraft -SKYPICKUP is a revolutionary 5-seat Light Transport aircraft-
Spider Anti-Tank Missile System
 Anti-Hail Rocket A6 and A8
 Newest Unmanned aerial vehicle  and Unmanned combat aerial vehicle --  High Speed Target Drone and Rapier Unmanned Helicopter, Tip-Jet Helicopter ...

See also
 Defense industry of Serbia

References

External links
 

Companies established in 1985
Companies based in Belgrade
Aerospace companies of Serbia
1985 establishments in Serbia
Defense industry of Serbia
Defense companies of Serbia